Frank Jarvis (13 May 1941 – 15 September 2010) was a British character actor.

He was educated at Orange Hill County Grammar School for Boys, Edgware, where he played Puck in A Midsummer Night's Dream and  the title role in Bernard Shaw's Saint Joan. He trained at RADA and made his film debut in Mix Me a Person (1962).

One of Jarvis' best known cinema roles was his portrayal of Roger in the 1969 British crime caper film, The Italian Job. In one of the film's iconic scenes, Jarvis' character is stranded in a bus hanging off a cliff. He also appeared in films such as That Kind of Girl (1963), Rotten to the Core (1965), Nobody Ordered Love (1972), Out of Season (1975) and A Bridge Too Far (1977).

His television appearances include the Doctor Who serials The War Machines (1966), Underworld (1978) and The Power of Kroll (1978).

With Wendy Mcphee he toured Europe with the Shakespeare company Theatre Set-Up on many summer seasons, travelling throughout England and the Isle of Man as well as Belgium and Denmark.

Jarvis died on 15 September 2010, at the age of 69. He was a resident of Merry Hill Road in Bushey, Hertfordshire.

Filmography

References

External links

 Obituary in The Guardian
 Obituary in The Independent

1941 births
2010 deaths
English male film actors
English male television actors
Alumni of RADA
Actors from Stockton-on-Tees
People from Bushey
Male actors from Hertfordshire
Actors from County Durham